The 1977 Kansas City Royals season was their ninth in Major League Baseball. The Royals' franchise-best 102–60 record led the majors and Kansas City won its second consecutive American League West title. Once again, the Royals lost to the New York Yankees in the postseason, falling 3–2 in the 1977 American League Championship Series. Hal McRae led the American League in doubles, with 54. Al Cowens set a franchise single-season record with 112 runs batted in.

Offseason
 November 5, 1976: Ruppert Jones was drafted from the Royals by the Seattle Mariners with the first pick in the 1976 Major League Baseball expansion draft.
 December 6, 1976: Jamie Quirk, Jim Wohlford and a player to be named later were traded by the Kansas City Royals to the Milwaukee Brewers for Jim Colborn and Darrell Porter. The Kansas City Royals completed the trade by sending Bob McClure to the Brewers on March 15, 1977.
 December 7, 1976: Frank Ortenzio was traded by the Royals to the Montreal Expos for Rudy Kinard (minors).

Regular season

Season standings

Record vs. opponents

Opening Day starters 
 George Brett
 Al Cowens
 Pete LaCock
 John Mayberry
 Hal McRae
 Amos Otis
 Freddie Patek
 Darrell Porter
 Paul Splittorff
 Frank White

Notable transactions 
 May 27, 1977: Tim Ireland was signed as a free agent by the Royals.

Roster

Player stats

Batting

Starters by position 
Note: Pos = Position; G = Games played; AB = At bats; H = Hits; Avg. = Batting average; HR = Home runs; RBI = Runs batted in

Other batters 
Note: G = Games played; AB = At bats; H = Hits; Avg. = Batting average; HR = Home runs; RBI = Runs batted in

Pitching

Starting pitchers 
Note: G = Games pitched; IP = Innings pitched; W = Wins; L = Losses; ERA = Earned run average; SO = Strikeouts

Other pitchers 
Note: G = Games pitched; IP = Innings pitched; W = Wins; L = Losses; ERA = Earned run average; SO = Strikeouts

Relief pitchers 
Note: G = Games pitched; W = Wins; L = Losses; SV = Saves; ERA = Earned run average; SO = Strikeouts

Other events
Before they were to play a game on June 12th against the Milwaukee Brewers at Milwaukee County Stadium, thieves stole gloves and uniforms belonging to Royals players. Due to this, all but seven Kansas City Royals players had to wear Milwaukee road uniforms for the game played that day.

ALCS

Game 1 
October 5: Yankee Stadium, New York City

Game 2 
October 6: Yankee Stadium, New York City

Game 3 
October 7: Royals Stadium, Kansas City, Missouri

Game 4 
October 8: Royals Stadium, Kansas City, Missouri

Game 5 
October 9: Royals Stadium, Kansas City, Missouri

Farm system

Notes

References

External links 
1977 Kansas City Royals at Baseball Reference
1977 Kansas City Royals at Baseball Almanac

Kansas City Royals seasons
Kansas City Royals season
American League West champion seasons
Kansas City